The Hira Company Ltd (incorporating Texet Sales Ltd) is a family-owned UK company based in Manchester, England specialising in the import and distribution of consumables.

Their subsidiary Texet was founded in the 1970s and focuses on calculators and electronic gadgets. It was partly responsible for driving Sinclair out of the pocket calculator market, often with devices manufactured in Far Eastern countries such as Hong Kong and South Korea. The company still sells calculators and similar devices under the Texet name and- - claimed to have 26% of the UK calculator market.

External links
Official Site

References

Electronics companies of the United Kingdom
Companies based in Manchester